Maiocchi is an Italian surname. Notable people with the surname include:

Mario Maiocchi (1913–?), Italian ice hockey player
Riki Maiocchi (1940–2004), Italian singer and musician

Italian-language surnames